Polynucleobacter rarus is an aerobic, chemo-organotrophic, catalase- and oxidase-positive, nonmotile bacterium of the genus Polynucleobacter, isolated from an acidic lake in Wisconsin.

References

External links 

Type strain of Polynucleobacter rarus at BacDive -  the Bacterial Diversity Metadatabase

Burkholderiaceae
Bacteria described in 2011